Nadia Petrova and Meghann Shaughnessy were the defending champions, but lost in quarterfinals to Lisa Raymond and Rennae Stubbs.

Svetlana Kuznetsova and Alicia Molik won the title, defeating Raymond and Stubbs 7–5, 6–7(5–7), 6–2 in the final. It was the 12th doubles title for Kuznetsova and the 6th doubles title for Molik in their respective careers.

Seeds

Draw

Finals

Top half

Bottom half

Qualifying

Qualifying seeds

Qualifiers
  Stéphanie Cohen-Aloro /  Selima Sfar

Lucky losers
  Alina Jidkova /  Tatiana Perebiynis

Qualifying draw

References
 Official results archive (ITF)
 Official results archive (WTA)

2005 NASDAQ-100 Open
NASDAQ-100 Open